Kirtisinh Vaghela is an Indian politician. He is State Education Minister.He is a Member of Legislative Assembly from Kankrej constituency in Gujarat legislative assembly, elected in 2017. He is associated with Bharatiya Janata Party.kankarej matvistar Rajput family bilong and he village khariya

Political history

References

Year of birth missing (living people)
Living people
Gujarat MLAs 2017–2022
Gujarati people
People from Banaskantha district
Bharatiya Janata Party politicians from Gujarat